Bruno Sambo (born 24 March 1996) is a French professional footballer who plays as a right-back for Championnat National 2 club Bourges.

Career
Sambo made his professional debut for Ajaccio in a 2–0 Ligue 2 win over Bourg-en-Bresse on 29 September 2017. In the summer of 2018, Sambo transferred to Bourges Foot.

References

External links
 
 
 

1996 births
Living people
French footballers
Black French sportspeople
Association football fullbacks
INF Clairefontaine players
AC Boulogne-Billancourt players
AC Ajaccio players
Bourges Foot players
Bourges Foot 18 players
Championnat National 3 players
Ligue 2 players
Championnat National 2 players